Geoff Burrowes (born 1945) is an Australian filmmaker best known for the movie The Man from Snowy River (1982) and the TV mini-series Anzacs (1985); he was a founding partner of the Burrowes Film Group.

He worked in television in the 1970s and also was press secretary to Moss Cass.

He retired from filmmaking.

Select Credits
 The Man from Snowy River (1982) - producer, story
Anzacs (1985) - producer
Cool Change (1985) - producer
Running from the Guns (1987) - producer
Backstage (1988) - producer
The Man from Snowy River II (1988) - writer, director, producer
Run (1991) - director

References

External links

Australian film producers
1945 births
Living people